Robert Francis Withers Allston (April 21, 1801April 7, 1864) was the 67th Governor of South Carolina. He was born in Waccamaw, South Carolina.

He graduated from the United States Military Academy at West Point in 1821, and briefly served as second lieutenant of artillery before resigning in February 1822.

Career 
He was elected to the South Carolina House of Representatives in 1828, serving in that body through 1831. In 1834, he was elected to the South Carolina Senate, serving in that body until 1856, while there he was appointed Senate President in 1847 and was involved  in several disputed elections involving the Prince George Winyah S.C. Senate seat, in large part because of his staunch support of nullification. From 1856 to 1858 he served as Governor of South Carolina. Following South Carolina's secession, he was a Confederate presidential elector.

Family and background 
His family was able to maintain two houses in Georgetown and several plantations, including the Allston ancestral home on the Pee Dee River, Chicora Wood—one of the five plantations Robert Allston owned, with over 9,500 acres and at least 690 enslaved Blacks, making him the eighth largest slaveowner in United States history. On his farms he primarily grew rice and published several works on rice planting, including the well-regarded Memoir of the Introduction and Planting of Rice in South-Carolina (1843) and Essay on Sea Coast Crops (1854). Allston's daughter, Elizabeth Waties Allston Pringle, took over the management of Chicora Wood after his death.

Born in 1801 as a younger son to a Georgetown rice plantation who died when Robert was a child. In 1832, he married Adeline (Adéle) Theresa Petigru (b. 1811 d. 1896.) She was the younger sister of James Louis Petigru, a well-known Charleston SC lawyer. They moved to Chicora Woods and had the following children:

1. Benjamin b.1833 d.1900
2. Robert b. 1834 d.1839
3. Charlotte Frances b. 1837 d. 1843
4. Adele Petigru Vanderhorst b. 1840 d.1915
5. Louise Gibert b. 1842 d. 1843
6. Elizabeth Waties Pringle b. 1845 d.1876
7. Charles Petigru b. 1848 d.1922
8. Jane Louise Hill b. 1850 d. 1937
9. Unnamed infant son b. 1852 

Source: A family of Women: The Carolina Petigrus in Peace and at War, Jayne H. Pease and William H. Pease, c. 1999 University of North Carolina Press/Chapel Hill and London. .

See also
Nathaniel Russell House

References

Who Was Who in America:Historical Volume, 1607-1896. Chicago: Quincy Who's Who, 1967.
 http://atlantablackstar.com/2014/12/23/9-of-the-biggest-slave-owners-in-american-history/8/
 South Carolina encyclopedia. http://www.scencyclopedia.org/sce/entries/allston-robert-francis-withers/

Further reading

External links
SCIway Biography of Robert Francis Withers Allston
NGA Biography of Robert Francis Withers Allston 
Service Profile

1801 births
1864 deaths
United States Military Academy alumni
Democratic Party members of the South Carolina House of Representatives
Democratic Party South Carolina state senators
Democratic Party governors of South Carolina
University of South Carolina trustees
19th-century American politicians
American white supremacists
American planters
American slave owners